Mordella lebisi is a species of beetle in the genus Mordella of the family Mordellidae, which is part of the superfamily Tenebrionoidea. It was discovered in 1937.

References

Beetles described in 1937
lebisi